Nambinar Keduvathillai is a 1986 Indian Tamil language Hindu devotional film, directed by K. Shankar and produced by Kamakshi Shankar. The film stars Vijayakanth, Prabhu, Jayashree and Sudha Chandran. It was released on 23 May 1986.

Plot

Cast 

 Vijayakanth
 Prabhu
 Jayashree
Sudha Chandran
Jayamala
M. N. Nambiar
Master Sridhar
Senthil
Jai Ganesh
Sirkazhi Govindarajan
LIC Narasimhan
V. Gopalakrishnan
Vadivukkarasi
V. K. Ramasamy
Manorama
C. K. Saraswathi
Oru Viral Krishna Rao
Suryakanth
Rajeev

Production 
The song "Nambinar" was shot at the 18 steps of Sabarimala from 8 to 13 March 1986.

Soundtrack 
Soundtrack was composed by M. S. Viswanathan.
"Nambinar" – K. J. Yesudas, Vani Jairam
"Gokula Kanna" – K. S. Chithra
"Jyothisa Roobane" – K. S. Chithra
"Aethriya Deepathai" – Vani Jairam
"Swamiye Saranam" – Sirkazhi Govindarajan
"Pathinettam Padikale" – M. S. Viswanathan

Controversy 
The film's crew was sued by an Ayyappa devotee for allowing actress Sudha Chandran to enter Sabarimala. The film's director was let off, but Sudha was fined.

References

External links 
 

1980s Tamil-language films
1986 films
Films directed by K. Shankar
Films scored by M. S. Viswanathan
Hindu devotional films